Tūheitia Potatau Te Wherowhero VII  (born Tūheitia Paki; 21 April 1955), crowned as Kīngi Tūheitia, is the Māori King. He is the eldest son of the previous Māori monarch, Te Arikinui Dame Te Atairangikaahu, and was announced as her successor and crowned on 21 August 2006, the day her tangihanga (funeral rites) took place.

Family

King Tūheitia (born Tūheitia Paki) is the son of Whatumoana Paki (1926–2011) and Te Arikinui Dame Te Atairangikaahu (1931–2006), who married in 1952. He was educated at Rakaumanga School in Huntly, Southwell School in Hamilton and St. Stephen's College (Te Kura o Tipene) in Bombay, south of Auckland. He has five sisters and one brother: Heeni Katipa ( Paki); Tomairangi Paki; Mihi ki te ao Paki; Kiki Solomon ( Paki); Manawa Clarkson ( Paki), and brother Maharaia Paki.

He is married to Makau Ariki Te Atawhai and they have three children: Whatumoana, Korotangi, and Ngawai Hono I Te Po.

Following his ascent to the throne, the Makau Ariki was appointed patron of the Māori Women's Welfare League in 2007 and Te Kohao Health, a Māori public health organisation.

Duties and background

The King generally speaks publicly only once a year, at the annual celebrations in Ngāruawāhia of his coronation.
Since ascending to the throne his official duties have included attending the following events:

 funeral of King Taufa'ahau Tupou IV of Tonga, September 2006
 opening of Pūkawa Marae on the shore of Lake Taupo, Aotearoa, on 17–19 November 2006
 opening of "Mauri Ora" an exhibition of Māori artefacts from Te Papa on exhibition at the Tokyo National Museum in Tokyo, Japan on 22 January 2007
 funeral of Malietoa Tanumafili II of Samoa, 19 May 2007
 re-opening of the marae/war memorial hall in Ngaiotonga, Whangaruru 2007
 opening of the Māori garden in Hamilton Gardens, 2008
 unveiling of Te Kawerau a Maki's new pou for the Arataki Visitor Centre in the Waitākere Ranges in 2011
 haka and speech for the fleet of 110 waka to commemorate 160 years of Kiingitanga in 2018
private audience with Pope Francis at the Vatican in May 2019

In May 2019, King Tūheitia and members of the Whare Ariki traveled to Italy where the King met Pope Francis in a Private Audience at the Vatican. The two met and discussed issues pertaining to Te Iwi Maori and indigenous peoples around the world. King Tūheitia also issued a formal invitation for the Pope to visit Turangawaewae Marae and Aotearoa.

In 2018, to honour King Tūheitia and his leadership of the Kiingitanga, the General Synod of the Anglican Church in Aotearoa, New Zealand and Polynesia, journeyed to Turangawaewae Marae to join with the multitudes in honouring the 160 years of this Monarchy.

Tūheitia attends hundreds of events every year both nationally and internationally. He is the patron to several key organisations; including Te Matatini, the largest Māori Cultural Festival in the world, Kirikiriroa Marae a large urban Marae in Hamilton.

He frequently receives International dignitaries, foreign Diplomats, members of other Royal families and members of Governments. In 2014 the King notably received 26 diplomats to discuss international and trade interests for the Kiingitanga.

In 2009 King Tūheitia visited the New Zealand Parliament and was acknowledged in the valedictory speech of the former Prime Minister of New Zealand, Helen Clark. In the same year, the King accompanied Helen Clark to the United Nations upon her appointment as the United Nations Development Programme administrator.

The King regularly attends significant events of Māoridom up and down the country. In July 2018, the King and Royal family attended the 150th Celebrations of the Ringatu Church; to which the King's eldest grandson, Hikairo, has been baptised. The King also frequently attends the annual 25 January celebrations of the Ratana Church expressing his continued support for all denominations and his deep desire to unify the people.

Poukai 
The Poukai is an annual series of visits by the Māori King to Marae around and beyond the Tainui region, a tradition that dates back to the 19th century. Poukai were established by the second Māori King, Tāwhiao, who said "Kua whakatūria e ahau tēnei kaupapa hei whāngai i te pouaru, te pani me te rawakore, he kuaha whānui kua puare ki te puna tangata me te puna kai" (I have instituted this gathering to feed the widowed, the bereaved and the destitute, it is a doorway that has been opened to the multitudes of people and the bounty of food).

There are 29 Poukai every year and King Tūheitia attends each one. Poukai are a critical event in the Kiingitanga calendar. A unique element of Poukai is their focus on: te pani (the bereaved), te pouaru (the widowed) and te rawakore (the destitute). These events, led by the current monarch, are put in place to assist and help ease the burdens and challenges faced by people.

Political advancements

King Tūheitia has been at the forefront of many political issues, particularly pertaining to Māori. In 2018 the King launched, in collaboration with the New Zealand Police and Ministry of Justice, the Iwi Justice Panel. This approach to restorative justice aims to reduce incarceration rates among Māori, which are among the highest for an indigenous people in the world.

In 2017, King Tūheitia led a groundbreaking moment for the Kiingitanga by signing a formal Accord with the Ministry of Corrections, on behalf of the Government of New Zealand. This award-winning Accord led to the development of the Iwi Justice Panels, and also a further partnership venture with Corrections to build a reintegration Center for incarcerated women who gave birth to a child while in prison. In an exclusive visit to a women's prison in Auckland, the King visited mothers and their children and pledged  to do more for all incarcerated people.

In 2014 the King received a group from White Ribbon NZ who were travelling New Zealand promoting an anti-violence campaign.

Tekau-ma-Rua and Te Kahui Wairua 

In 2012 King Tūheitia formally established his Tekau-mā-Rua (the twelve, an advisory council); each monarch has had a Tekau-mā-Rua to offer advice and act as a senior council within the Kiingitanga. He also added a spiritual council, called Te Kāhui Wairua. These two councils work together in providing advice, guidance and a strategic platform for the King and the Kiingitanga. For the first time for the Kiingitanga, King Tūheitia's Tekau-mā-Rua is made up of members from outside of the Waikato tribal region (the King's direct tribe).

Tekau-mā-Rua 
:

Te Kāhui Wairua 

:

*Archdeacon Simmonds is the Chaplain to the Kiingitanga and Private Chaplain to the King.

Honours

 In 2009, King Tuheitia was appointed a Knight of the Venerable Order of Saint John by Queen Elizabeth II, and he was presented with the insignia for the honour by the governor-general, Sir Jerry Mateparae in 2016 during the 10th anniversary commemorations of the King's coronation,  
 He was appointed to Grand Cross of the Order of the Crown of Tonga during the coronation ceremonies of King George Tupou V of Tonga. 
 In 2010 he was appointed Knight Commander of the Order of Saint Lazarus.
 In 2016, in celebration of the King's 10th Coronation Anniversary, the mayor of Hamilton awarded him the city's highest honour, the Freedom of the City. In the same year the King also received an honorary doctorate from the University of Waikato.
 In 2022, the Secretary-General of Slovak NGO Servare et Manere awarded him the Tree of Peace Memorial Plaque, the highest award of the association for his merits to friendship and understanding between nations and interfaith dialogue.

References

External links

 New Zealand Maori choose new king
 New Zealand Herald: New Maori monarch takes throne
 Pictures: Māori Monarchs since 1858

1955 births
Living people
Māori monarchs
People from Huntly, New Zealand
Knights Grand Cross of the Order of the Crown of Tonga